Kevin M. Scott is an American geologist, author, and fellow of the Geological Society of America (GSA). Scott is a Scientist Emeritus for the United States Geological Survey (USGS). The Kevin Islands of Antarctica are named after him.

Personal life 
According to Library of Congress Cataloging in Publication Data, Scott was born in 1935.

Scott received a master's and a bachelor's degree at UCLA, and a PhD at UW-Madison.

Career 
Scott has published works about geology from many regions around the world, including Mount Baker and Mount Rainier, Washington; Pinatubo, Philippines, Gerlache Strait, Antarctica, and multiple locations in China. He visited Dongchuan, China (in the Jiangjiagou Valley) in 1991 and 92, as well as in 2010, to be involved with the Dongchuan Debris Flow Observation and Research Station. Scott chaired a 2004 GSA Penrose Conference session, Sector collapse, avalanches, and lahars. He was also a convener of the 2007 GSA Cordilleran Section (a GSA event in Portland, Oregon co-convened by Dave Tucker). He also ran a book signing event at the 2019 GSA Cordilleran Section.

Scott has published extensively on the geology of the Puget Lowlands and Cascade Range volcanoes including Mount St. Helens. His work was covered by the New York Times in 1987.

Scott has worked with multiple notable geologists, including Dave Tucker, and fellow Kirk Bryan Award winners Jon J. Major and William B. Bull.

Scott is the author of the book The Voice of This Stone, detailing the events of different volcanic events from throughout history. After the book was published, Scott was picked up by a local newspaper, The Columbian, who published a story on his geologic research work.

Awards 

 1989: Kirk Bryan Award (GSA)
 2005-6: Partners-in-Science Award (M.J. Murdock Charitable Trust)

Memberships and affiliations 

 2011: Board of Directors, Mount Baker Volcano Research Center (MBVRC)
 Associate Editor in Chief, Journal of Mountain Science

Footnotes

External links 
Find publications via:
 Kevin M. Scott on ScienceBase-Catalog
 Kevin M. Scott on U.S. Geological Survey
 Kevin M. Scott on Springer-Link
 Kevin M. Scott on Wiley

1935 births
Living people
University of California, Los Angeles alumni
University of Wisconsin–Madison alumni
20th-century American geologists
20th-century American non-fiction writers
United States Geological Survey personnel